"Let's Fall to Pieces Together" is a song written by Dickey Lee, Johnny Russell and Tommy Rocco, and recorded by American country music singer George Strait.  It was released in May 1984 as the third and final single from the album Right or Wrong.  The song was George Strait's fifth number one on the country chart.

Content
The narrator is a man who has lost the love of his life. He heads to the jukebox and while playing sad songs he notices another woman going through the same situation. He pitches the idea that maybe if they spent some time together they could comfort each other's loss. The song states that alone is much better together.

Critical reception
Dan Milliken of Country Universe gave the song a 'B' grade, saying that it has a great title that says it all upfront. He goes on to say that "the melody here lands just shy of memorable, and ditto to the story, which never takes its characters deeper than their first encounter at the jukebox." He refers to the song as the kind that will be jukeboxes "and the title pops out enough to ensure you’ll pick it."

Charts

Weekly charts

Year-end charts

References

1984 singles
George Strait songs
Songs written by Johnny Russell (singer)
Songs written by Dickey Lee
Song recordings produced by Ray Baker (music producer)
MCA Records singles
Songs written by Tommy Rocco
1983 songs